Tim Kome Owhefere (16 June 1963 – 27 January 2021) was a Nigerian lawyer and politician and a member of the Delta State House of Assembly representing Isoko North Constituency in the 7th Delta State House of Assembly. He also served as the Majority Leader of the Delta State House of Assembly.

Early life and education
Tim Kome Owhefere was from Akiewhe-Owhe, Isoko North, Delta State, Nigeria. He started his education by attending Government College, Ughelli, Delta State, before proceeding to Delta State Polytechnic, Ozoro where he studied mass communication. He went to Yaba College of Technology where he graduated with HND in publishing and communication. He furthered his education at University of Lagos where he received a law degree and a B.L. from the Nigerian Law School. He was later called to the Nigerian bar.

Political career
In 2007, Owhefere won the seat to represent Isoko North Constituency at the Delta State House of Assembly. He served as the Chief Whip, Majority Leader and the chairman, House Committee on information of Delta State House of Assembly. In April 2021, he was replaced by Jude Ogbimi.

Death
Owhefere died on 27 January 2021 at Federal Medical Centre, Asaba, Delta State, Nigeria.

References

1963 births
2021 deaths
Delta State politicians
Members of the Delta State House of Assembly
Peoples Democratic Party (Nigeria) politicians
Nigerian political candidates
People from Delta State
Delta State Polytechnic, Ozoro alumni
Yaba College of Technology alumni
University of Lagos alumni
Nigerian Law School alumni